Levomepromazine, also known as methotrimeprazine, is a phenothiazine neuroleptic drug. Brand names include Nozinan, Levoprome, Detenler, Hirnamin, Levotomin and Neurocil. It is a low-potency antipsychotic (approximately half as potent as chlorpromazine) with strong analgesic, hypnotic and antiemetic properties that are primarily used in palliative care.

Serious side effects include tardive dyskinesia, akathisia, abnormalities in the electrical cycle of the heart, low blood pressure and the potentially fatal neuroleptic malignant syndrome.

As is typical of phenothiazine antipsychotics, levomepromazine is a "dirty drug", that is, it exerts its effects by blocking a variety of receptors, including adrenergic receptors, dopamine receptors, histamine receptors, muscarinic acetylcholine receptors and serotonin receptors.

Medical uses
It can be used as an analgesic for moderate to severe pain in non-ambulant patients (the latter being because of its strong sedative effects).

Levomepromazine is also used at lower doses for the treatment of nausea and insomnia.

Levomepromazine is frequently prescribed and valued worldwide in palliative care medicine for its multimodal action, to treat intractable nausea or vomiting, and for severe delirium/agitation in the last days of life. Palliative care physicians will commonly prescribe it orally or via subcutaneous syringe drivers in combination with opioid analgesics such as hydromorphone.

Levomepromazine is used for the treatment of psychosis, particularly those of schizophrenia, and manic phases of bipolar disorder. It should only be used with caution in the treatment of agitated depressions, as it can cause akathisia as a side effect, which could worsen the agitation. A 2010 systematic review compared the efficacy of levomepromazine with atypical antipsychotic drugs:

Adverse effects
The most common side effect is akathisia. Levomepromazine has prominent sedative and anticholinergic/sympatholytic effects (dry mouth, hypotension, sinus tachycardia, night sweats) and may cause weight gain. These side effects normally preclude prescribing the drug in doses needed for full remission of schizophrenia, so it has to be combined with a more potent antipsychotic. In any case, blood pressure and EKG should be monitored regularly.

A rare but life-threatening side effect is neuroleptic malignant syndrome (NMS). The symptoms of NMS include muscle stiffness, convulsions and fever.

History 
The drug (under the name Nozinan) started clinical trials in France in 1956 and was studied in Canada 3 years later.

References

External links 

 
NOZINAN - Lévomépromazine Doctissimo Guides des Medicaments
 
 

Analgesics
Antiemetics
CYP2D6 inhibitors
Dimethylamino compounds
Typical antipsychotics
Phenothiazines
Phenol ethers